Cryo bio-crystallography is the application of crystallography to biological macromolecules at cryogenic temperatures.

Basic principles
Cryo crystallography enables X-ray data collection at cryogenic temperatures, typically 100K. 

Crystals are transferred from the solution they have grown in (called mother liquor) to a solution with a cryo-protectant to prevent ice formation.
Crystals are mounted in a glass fiber (as opposed to a capillary.)
Crystals are cooled by dipping directly into liquid nitrogen and then placed in a cryo cold stream.
Cryo cooled macromolecular crystals show reduced radiation damage by more than 70 times that at room temperature.

Advantages
Significant improvement of resolution in data collection
Reduced or eliminated radiation damage in crystals

Usefulness and applications
Crystallography of large biological macromolecules can be achieved while maintaining their solution state. The best known example is the ribosome.

References

See also
Ada Yonath

Crystallography